Rudin's conjecture is a mathematical hypothesis (in additive combinatorics and elementary number theory) concerning an upper bound for the number of squares in finite arithmetic progressions. The conjecture, which has applications in the theory of trigonometric series, was first stated by Walter Rudin in his 1960 paper Trigonometric series with gaps.

The conjecture asserts (in big O notation) that  and in its stronger form that, if , .

References

Combinatorics
Conjectures